Anomoepus is the name assigned to several fossil footprints first reported from Early Jurassic beds of the Connecticut River Valley, Massachusetts, USA in 1802. 
 
All four feet have left impressions. The smaller forefeet have five toes, whereas the larger hind feet have three toes. There is also an impression which might indicate where the creature rested. The footprints were discovered, amongst others, by a farm boy, Pliny Moody. E.B. Hitchcock, a clergyman, described the Anomoepus footprints and others as evidence of ancient birds. They have since been identified as belonging to a dinosaur, probably an ornithischian, as indicated by the number of toes and the absence of claws on the rear digits. Trackways assigned to Anomoepus from Western Australia, Poland and Czech Republic have also been described. Anomoepus is the name of the footprint, not of the dinosaur, the identity of which remains unknown.

Ichnospecies
A. scambus Hitchcock, 1848
A. ranivorus Ellenberger, 1970
A. vermivorous (Ellenberger, 1970)
A. minimus (Ellenberger, 1970)
A. minor (Ellenberger, 1970)
A. palmipes (Ellenberger, 1970)
A. natator (Ellenberger, 1970)
A. aviforma (Ellenberger, 1970)
A. galliforma (Ellenberger, 1970)
A. superaviforma (Ellenberger, 1970)
A. phalassianiforma (Ellenberger, 1970)
A. levis (Ellenberger, 1970)
A. popompoi (Ellenberger, 1970)
A. supervipes (Ellenberger, 1970)
A. fringilla (Ellenberger, 1974)
A. turda (Ellenberger, 1974)
A. minutus (Ellenberger, 1974)
A. perdiciforma (Ellenberger, 1974)
A. natatilis (Ellenberger, 1974)
A. levicauda (Ellenberger, 1974)
A. dodai (Ellenberger, 1974)
A. longicauda (Ellenberger, 1974)
A. moghrebensis Biron & Dutuit, 1981
A. pienkovskii Gierliński, 1991
A. karaszevskii (Gierliński, 1991)
A. moabensis (M.G. Lockley, S.Y. Yang, M. Matsukawa, F. Fleming, & Lim, 1992)

See also
 List of dinosaur ichnogenera

Ichnology
Connecticut River Valley trackways

References

Dinosaur trace fossils
Early Jurassic dinosaurs of North America
Paleontology in Massachusetts